The Main Thing may refer to:
 The Main Thing (Alsou album)
 The Main Thing (Real Estate album)
 "The Main Thing", a song by Roxy Music from the album Avalon